Malli may refer to:

 Mallinatha, 19th Jain Tirthankara
 an ancient tribe defeated by Alexander in the Mallian Campaign
 Malli (film), a 1998 Indian Tamil language film
 Melli, a town in Sikkim, India
 Mallı, a village in Azerbaijan
 Malli Mastan Babu (1974-2015), Indian mountaineer
 Choi Malli, a 15th-century Korean scholar
 Yunus Mallı (b. 1992), Turkish footballer

See also
 Mali (disambiguation)
 Mallee (disambiguation)